Tanzania–United Kingdom relations are bilateral relations between Tanzania and the United Kingdom. The United Kingdom has historically been a partner of Tanzania in many areas, particularly trade and security.

Trade 

Tanzanian exports to the United Kingdom are dominated by raw materials namely; tea, tobacco and precious stones. The United Kingdom is the largest non-African purchaser of Tanzanian tea. On the other hand, UK exports to Tanzania are mainly dominated by automobiles and electronic appliances.

Trade Statistics

Foreign Direct Investment 

Being the former colonial power, the United Kingdom is one of Tanzania's oldest trading partners. The United Kingdom is currently the top foreign direct investor in the country, overtaking South Africa in 2011. Foreign investment in the country is spread out across multiple sectors, such as mining, manufacturing and agriculture. Currently the only listed British firm on the Dar es Salaam Stock Exchange is Acacia Mining.

Tourism 

The United Kingdom is the top contributor of tourists to Tanzania after Kenya.

British Airways, use to operate direct flights between London and Dar es Salaam. Flights were suspended after 82 years of operations due to lack of profitability for the airline on the route on 31 March 2013.

References

External links 

 
United Kingdom
Bilateral relations of the United Kingdom
United Kingdom
United Kingdom and the Commonwealth of Nations
Relations of colonizer and former colony